Demon House is a 2018 American documentary horror film directed and written by Zak Bagans, starring Bagans, Billy Tolley, and Jay Wasley as themselves. The film follows the Ammons haunting case and was released in the United States on March 16, 2018, by Freestyle Releasing, with Lost Footage from the film being released on January 1, 2019 and an Uncut version airing shortly after on February 16, 2019.

Synopsis
Zak Bagans purchases the house in which the alleged Ammons hauntings occurred. Bagans leads a team of paranormal investigators to investigate the house. Strange things begin happening and the crew becomes fearful of what they may be involved in.

Cast
Zak Bagans
Jay Wasley
Billy Tolley

Production
Zak Bagans, the host of Travel Channel's Ghost Adventures, wrote and directed Demon House, the second film he has made since 2004. The film is based on the "mass hysteria" which surrounded the 2014 alleged demonic possession in Gary, Indiana of the Ammons family.

Release
The film played in select theaters nationwide before its digital release on March 16, 2018.

Critical response

Steve Barton of Dread Central said the film was one of the "single most compelling documentaries on the existence of the supernatural that I've ever witnessed".

Noel Murray, writing for the Los Angeles Times said of the film: "Zak Bagans' documentary Demon House is essentially an uncensored, overlong episode of his long-running Travel Channel series Ghost Adventures. And while this particular 'paranormal investigation' may terrify the more credulous among Bagans' fan base, skeptics are likely to feel bored and confused."

References

External links
 
 

2018 films
2018 horror films
American documentary films
American haunted house films
Documentary films about the paranormal
Docuhorror films
Films set in Indiana
Culture of Gary, Indiana
2010s English-language films
2010s American films